Michael M. Gottesman (born October 7, 1946, in Jersey City, New Jersey) is an American biochemist and physician-scientist. He was the deputy director (Intramural) of the National Institutes of Health (NIH) in the United States, and also Chief of the Laboratory of Cell Biology at the National Cancer Institute (NCI) within the NIH. He graduated summa cum laude in biochemical sciences in 1966 from Harvard College, and received his M.D. magna cum laude from Harvard Medical School in 1970. He then worked as an intern and resident at the Peter Dent Brigham Hospital in Boston, a research associate at the NIH, and an assistant professor at Harvard before taking a permanent position at the NIH in 1976.

His areas of expertise includes a major contribution to the discovery of P-glycoprotein (MDR1, ABCB1), the multidrug resistance efflux transporter associated with clinical resistance to anti-cancer agents. In 2007, he reported for the first time in Science magazine that silent polymorphisms can impact on the tertiary structure and function of a protein.

Gottesman is an elected member of the American Association for the Advancement of Science (1988), the National Academy of Medicine (2003), the Association of American Physicians (2006), the American Academy of Arts and Sciences (2010), and the National Academy of Sciences (2018).

On August 1, 2022, Gottesman was succeeded as director of the NIH Intramural Research Program by pediatric neurologist Nina F. Schor.

References

External links
NIH Intramural Research Program website
NIH homepage
NIH Institutes, Centers and Offices

1946 births
Living people
Harvard Medical School alumni
20th-century American biochemists
Fellows of the American Association for the Advancement of Science
Fellows of the American Society for Pharmacology and Experimental Therapeutics
Members of the National Academy of Medicine
Physician-scientists
American medical researchers
21st-century American biochemists
20th-century American physicians
21st-century American physicians
National Institutes of Health people
Harvard College alumni